The Lake Michigan Conference (LMC) was college athletic conference affiliated with the National Collegiate Athletic Association (NCAA) at the Division III level. Member institutions were all located in Wisconsin except Dominican University in Illinois. LMC schools joined with some schools from the Northern Illinois-Iowa Conference (NIIC) in the 2006–07 school year, creating the Northern Athletics Conference (NAC, now known as the Northern Athletics Collegiate Conference, or NACC).

History
The conference was formed as the Wisconsin Conference of Independent Colleges (WCIC) in 1969 with seven charter members; it changed its name in 1983.

Member schools

Charter members
 Blackhawk Technical College
 Cardinal Stritch University
 Gateway Technical College at (Kenosha)
 Gateway Technical College at (Racine)
 Maranatha Baptist Bible College
 Marian University
 Northwestern College
 St. Francis de Sales College

Final members

Notes

Former members

Notes

Sports
The LMC sponsored intercollegiate athletic competition in men's baseball, men's and women's basketball, men's and women's cross country, men's and women's golf, men's and women's soccer, women's softball, men's and women's tennis, women's volleyball, and men's wrestling.

References

External links
 Official website